German submarine U-380 was a Type VIIC U-boat built for Nazi Germany's Kriegsmarine for service during World War II. Her wartime career consisted of 11 patrols and resulted in two ships sunk for 14,063 GRT, one ship damaged, and another of 7,178 GRT that was later declared a total loss.

Design

German Type VIIC submarines were preceded by the shorter Type VIIB submarines. U-380 had a displacement of  when at the surface and  while submerged. She had two shafts and two  propellers.

U-380 was fitted with five  torpedo tubes (four fitted at the bow and one at the stern), fourteen torpedoes, one  SK C/35 naval gun, 220 rounds, and a  C/30 anti-aircraft gun. The boat had a complement of between forty-four and sixty.

Service history
U-380 was ordered by the Kriegsmarine on 16 October 1939. She was laid down just short of a year later at the Howaldtswerke yard in Kiel, on 1 October 1940. About thirteen months later, U-380 was launched in Kiel on 5 November 1941. She was formally commissioned  into the Kriegsmarine later that year, on 22 December.

First patrol
U-380 experienced her first taste of war on her first patrol. While stalking convoy ON-127 on 12 September 1942 in the central Atlantic, the submarine was detected and attacked by the convoy's escorts resulting in the failure of one of her diesel engines. The damage was not severe enough to warrant aborting the patrol, but the U-boat broke off her attack. Her first strike against allied shipping would come less than a week later when she torpedoed and sank the unescorted Norwegian motor merchant Olaf Fostenes (2,994 GRT). All 36 men aboard the merchant survived this attack. The U-boat crew questioned the crew, asking for the ship's master; the mariners lied to the Germans, telling them the master had been killed in the attack. U-380 returned to port on 7 October 1942.

Her next patrol, which lasted only 15 days, was still successful. On 11 November 1942, U-380 torpedoed and sank the 11,069 GRT Dutch passenger liner Nieuw Zeeland. The ship had recently participated in the North African landings of Operation Torch and was returning from that operation. 15 of the 256 souls aboard perished; the remainder were picked up by convoy escorts and later landed at Gibraltar.

Two uneventful patrols followed. It was not until 15 March 1943, while on her fifth patrol, that the U-boat had her next success. The British Liberty Ship Ocean Seaman, traveling with convoy ET-14, was torpedoed and badly damaged. Dead in the water, the stricken vessel was taken in tow and beached the next day near Algiers. She was declared a total loss.

On 10 May 1943, U-380 rescued five German soldiers who were escaping from Tunisia in a small boat. She landed them at La Spezia on 16 May.

A further two uneventful Mediterranean sorties followed. The veteran submarine departed on her eighth patrol on 11 August 1943, again prowling the Mediterranean for enemy shipping. Success arrived on 23 August when the 7,191 GRT American Liberty Ship Pierre Soulé was struck in the rudder by a single torpedo from U-380. The resulting explosion bodily lifted the ship out of the water. She was repaired in dry dock at Taranto and returned to service.

Despite undertaking three further patrols, U-380 had no further successes during her career.

Loss
One man of the crew, Maschinenmaat Jonny Christoph, was killed aboard U-380.

Wolfpacks
U-380 took part in four wolfpacks, namely:
 Stier (29 August – 2 September 1942)
 Vorwärts (2 – 25 September 1942)
 Delphin (5 – 12 November 1942)
 Wal (12 – 15 November 1942)

Summary of raiding history

References

Bibliography

External links

World War II submarines of Germany
1941 ships
Ships built in Kiel
U-boats sunk in 1944
U-boats sunk by US aircraft
World War II shipwrecks in the Mediterranean Sea
German Type VIIC submarines
U-boats commissioned in 1941
Maritime incidents in March 1944